The 2019 FedEx Cup Playoffs, the series of three golf tournaments that will determine the season champion on the U.S.-based PGA Tour, was played from August 8–25. It included the following three events:
The Northern Trust – Liberty National Golf Club, Jersey City, New Jersey
BMW Championship – Medinah Country Club, Medinah, Illinois
Tour Championship – East Lake Golf Club, Atlanta, Georgia

They were the 13th FedEx Cup playoffs since their inception in 2007.

The point distributions can be seen here.

Changes for 2019
There were a number of changes in the format compared to previous years.

The playoffs were moved to an earlier date, finishing by the end of August rather than in late September.
There were only 3 events rather than 4, with the Dell Technologies Championship being dropped. The leading 70 players after The Northern Trust qualified for the BMW Championship whereas previously the leading 100 qualified for the Dell Technologies Championship, after which the leading 70 qualified for the BMW Championship.
An additional bonus pool, the Wyndham Rewards Top 10, was distributed among the leading 10 players after the Wyndham Championship which ended the regular season. The pool was $10 million with the leader receiving $2 million.
The FedEx Cup bonus pool was increased from $35 to $60 million, with the winner's share increasing from $10 to $15 million.
Major changes were made to the Tour Championship format. In the new system players will receive a stroke advantage based on their position in the FedEx Cup rankings after the BMW Championship. The FedExCup leader will start the Tour Championship at −10, number two at −8, number three at −7, number four at −6 and number five at −5. Players ranked 6 to 10 will start at −4, 11 to 15 at −3, 16 to 20 at −2, 21 to 25 at −1 and 26 to 30 will start from 0. The winner of the Tour Championship will be the FedEx Cup winner.(Previously each player's points total was reset after the BMW Championship based on their position in the rankings at that stage. These reset points, added to the points earned in the Tour Championship, determined the final FedEx Cup rankings.)
For the purposes of the Official World Golf Ranking, the stroke advantages in the Tour Championship were ignored.

Regular season rankings

Source:

The Northern Trust
The Northern Trust was played August 8–11. Of the 125 players eligible to play in the event, four did not play: Paul Casey (ranked 8th), Rafa Cabrera-Bello (59), Henrik Stenson (85) and Sam Burns (89), reducing the field to 121. 85 players made the second-round cut at 141 (−1).

Patrick Reed won by a stroke over Abraham Ancer. The top 70 players in the points standings advanced to the BMW Championship. This included four players who were outside the top 70 prior to The Northern Trust: Troy Merritt (ranked 72nd to 59th), Joaquín Niemann (74 to 70), Wyndham Clark (90 to 68), and Harold Varner III (102 to 29). Four players started the tournament within the top 70 but ended the tournament outside the top 70, ending their playoff chances: Sergio García (ranked 65th to 72nd), Danny Lee (66 to 73), Kevin Streelman (68 to 75), and Matthew Wolff (70 to 74).	

Par 71 course

BMW Championship
The BMW Championship was played August 15–18. Of the 70 players eligible to play in the event, only Kevin Na (ranked 55th) did not play, reducing the field to 69. There was no second-round cut.

Justin Thomas won by 3 strokes from Patrick Cantlay. The top 30 players in the points standings advanced to the Tour Championship. This included three players who were outside the top 30 prior to the BMW Championship: Jason Kokrak (ranked 32nd to 30th), Hideki Matsuyama (33 to 15), and Lucas Glover (41 to 29). Three players started the tournament within the top 30 but ended the tournament outside the top 30, ending their playoff chances: Shane Lowry (25 to 33), Harold Varner III (29 to 38) and Andrew Putnam (30 to 34).	

Par 72 course

Points after BMW Championship

Tour Championship
The Tour Championship was played August 22–25. 30 golfers qualified for the tournament. There was no second-round cut. Rory McIlroy won the event, finishing four strokes ahead of Xander Schauffele. McIlroy had started the tournament at −5, a one stroke advantage over Schauffele who started at −4.	

Par 70 course

For the full list see here.

Table of qualified players
Table key:

* First-time Playoffs qualifier

References

External links
Coverage on the PGA Tour's official site

FedEx Cup
PGA Tour
PGA Tour events
FedEx Cup Playoffs
FedEx Cup Playoffs
FedEx Cup Playoffs